Presidency University, Bangladesh is a private university with two campuses, in Gulshan and Baridhara, Dhaka, Bangladesh. Presidency University has three schools containing four departments with a strong emphasis on research-based education. The Gulshan campus was established in 2003. In 2008, the university opened a second campus in nearby Banani, Dhaka to cater to the growing number of students. Two new campus added in 2020 at Baridhara, Dhaka. More than 1,500 students are enrolled. The number of faculty members teaching at the university is nearly 100.

Schools 
 Azimur Rahman School of Engineering
 Department of Civil Engineering (CE)
 Department of ECE offers the following courses:
 BSc. In Electrical & Electronic Engineering (EEE) and
 BSc. In Electronics & Telecommunication Engineering (ETE)
 BSc. In Computer Science & Engineering (CSE)
 Moazzam Hossain School of Business
 Department of Business Administration
 Shamsul Alamin School of Liberal Arts & Social Sciences
 Department of English

Academic semester
The academic duration of PU has three semesters a year:
 Spring semester: January–April
 Summer semester: May–August
 Fall semester: September–December

Lab facilities for CSE/EEE/ETE students
 Computer Lab
 Outstanding Courses
 Physics Lab
 Chemistry Lab
 Electrical Circuits Lab
 Electronics Lab
 Electrical Machine Lab
 Measurement & Instrumentation Lab
 High Voltage Engineering Lab
 Power Electronics Lab
 Analog Electronics Lab
 VLSI Lab
 Computer Networks Lab
 Digital Signal processing Lab
 Software Engineering Lab
 Microprocessor and Interfacing Lab
 Digital Logic Designing Lab
 Control Systems Lab
 IC Fabrication Lab(Analog & Digital)
 Communication Engineering Lab including
  Digital Communication Lab
  Optical Fiber Communication Lab
  Wireless Communication Lab
  RF Communication Lab
  Microwave Engg. Lab

Lab facilities for Civil Engineering students
 Computer Lab
 Physics Lab
 Chemistry Lab
 Environmental Engg. Lab
 Fluid Mechanics Lab
 Engineering Drawing, Designing & CAD Lab
 Engineering Materials Lab
 Structural Mechanics Lab
 GIS Lab
 Geotechnical Engineering Lab 
 Open Channel Hydraulics Lab
 Water and Waste Water Quality Lab
 Highway Materials and Traffic Engg. Lab
 Quantity surveying Lab

List of vice-chancellors 
 Prof. Dr. Mohammed Muniruzzaman ( present )

Publications
 Presidency University Journal (PUJ: ISSN 2224-7610)

Presidency University Journal is a publication of the Presidency University in Bangladesh. This printed journal publishes original, empirical and innovative materials in functional and support areas of multidisciplinary subjects such as information and communication technology, civil engineering, electrical and telecommunication engineering, architecture, business, economics, literature, education and law, etc. It is primarily devoted to the extension and further development and dissemination of knowledge in the field of education for the benefit of academics as well as practicing enterprise managers as well as entrepreneurs. The journal has obtained International Standard Serial Number (ISSN) 2224–7610. PUJ is a blind refereed journal.
 SPOTLIGHT (স্পটলাইট)

Library
Library resources include text and reference books, CDs, floppies, and subscription to 10 daily newspapers and three magazines.

References 

Private universities in Bangladesh
Universities and colleges in Dhaka
2003 establishments in Bangladesh
Educational institutions established in 2003